Rohullah Nikpai (born June 15, 1987) is an ethnic Hazara taekwondo practitioner and two-time Olympic bronze medalist from Afghanistan.

Career
Nikpai started his training in Kabul, Afghanistan, at the age of 10. During the civil war over the capital city, his family left the city and settled in one of Iran's many Afghan refugee camps.  He soon became a member of the Afghan refugee Taekwondo team after watching martial arts films. He returned to Kabul in 2004 and continued his training at the government provided Olympic training facility. At the 2006 Asian Games in Doha, Qatar Nikpai competed in the flyweight division where he was defeated by eventual silver medalist Nattapong Tewawetchapong of Thailand in the round of 16.

Nikpai competed in the 58 kg category at the 2008 Summer Olympics, defeating two-time world champion Juan Antonio Ramos of Spain to win the bronze medal, making him Afghanistan's first Olympic medalist in any event. He became a national hero, returning to Afghanistan and getting off the plane to be met with a crowd of many thousands. Afghanistan president Hamid Karzai immediately called to congratulate Nikpai. Karzai also awarded him a house, car, and other luxuries at the government’s expense. "I hope this will send a message of peace to my country after 30 years of war," Nikpai said. In the 2012 Summer Olympics, Rohullah entered the 68 kg category, where he was defeated by Iran's Mohammad Bagheri Motamed; he eventually won his bronze medal at the Olympic Games after defeating Martin Stamper of Great Britain.

See also
 Afghanistan at the 2008 Summer Olympics
 Afghanistan at the 2012 Summer Olympics

References

External links

 
 
 

1987 births
Living people
Hazara sportspeople
People from Maidan Wardak Province
Taekwondo practitioners at the 2008 Summer Olympics
Afghan expatriates in Iran
Afghan male taekwondo practitioners
Olympic taekwondo practitioners of Afghanistan
Olympic bronze medalists for Afghanistan
Olympic medalists in taekwondo
Taekwondo practitioners at the 2012 Summer Olympics
Taekwondo practitioners at the 2006 Asian Games
Taekwondo practitioners at the 2010 Asian Games
Medalists at the 2012 Summer Olympics
Medalists at the 2008 Summer Olympics
Asian Games competitors for Afghanistan
World Taekwondo Championships medalists
Asian Taekwondo Championships medalists